Pierre Durand may refer to:

 Pierre Durand (pastor) (died 1732), French Huguenot pastor and martyr
 Pierre Durand (equestrian, born 1931) (1931–2016), French Olympic equestrian
 Pierre Durand (equestrian, born 1955), French Olympic equestrian champion

See also
 Peter Durand, British merchant who patented the tin can
 Durand (surname)